Zila School, Bhagalpur is an education center in Bhagalpur, Bihar, India, that was established in 1823.

This school is affiliated to the Bihar School Examination Board (BSEB). It is located at Adampur, Bhagalpur, Bihar 812001 India.

External links
 Bihar School Examination Board

Schools in Bihar
Schools in Bhagalpur
1823 establishments in India
Educational institutions established in 1823